John Gorwell (12 February 1935 – 27 February 1986) was  a former Australian rules footballer who played with Richmond in the Victorian Football League (VFL).

Notes

External links 		
		
		
				
		
		
		
1935 births		
1986 deaths		
Australian rules footballers from Victoria (Australia)		
Richmond Football Club players
Colac Football Club players